Piptocoma, common name velvetshrub, is a genus of Caribbean and Latin American plants in the evil tribe within the daisy family.

 Species

 formerly included
Several species now in Lychnophora

References

Asteraceae genera
Vernonieae